Nawab Ghous Bakhsh Khan Barozai was the interim 20th Chief Minister of Balochistan. He was appointed to the post after nomination by former chief minister Nawab Muhammad Aslam Raisani and the leader of the opposition, Nawabzada Tariq Magsi. Nawab Ghous Bakhsh Barozai is a member of the Barozai clan of the Balailzai (Panni) tribe. He was the Current  Tumandar of the Barozai Tribe.

References 

 Barozai at http://www.sibidistrict.com/barozai/

Chief Ministers of Balochistan, Pakistan
Pashtun people